Saltsburg Middle-High School, established in 1984, served students from Saltsburg Borough, Conemaugh and Young Townships in Indiana County and Loyalhanna Township in Westmoreland County. The campus was located on Route 286 in Conemaugh Township.

School structure 
Middle school students transition from elementary to secondary through the 6th-8th grade program, which offers four core subjects, "block" classes, and "rotation" classes. They also are assigned to a monthly Adviser-Advisee Program that promotes academic success and also serves as the facilitation point for the district's Graduation Project.

Curriculum 
To graduate from SMHS, a student must obtain 23.2 credits of coursework and complete a graduation project.

Coursework is as follows: 

Approximately 10% of Saltsburg High School students attend the Indiana County Technology Center in nearby Indiana for half of their school day.

Matriculation
 50% of graduates attend four-year schools,
 40% attend two-year or technical schools
 10% seeking employment or military options.

Extracurricular activities

Athletics
Saltsburg is in PIAA District 6:
Fall
 Football
 Golf
 Volleyball
Winter
 Basketball
Spring
 Baseball
 Track and field

References

Public high schools in Pennsylvania
Public middle schools in Pennsylvania
Schools in Indiana County, Pennsylvania
Educational institutions established in 1984
1984 establishments in Pennsylvania